Ivana Lisjak was the defending champion, but chose not to participate.

Sorana Cîrstea won the title defeating Sofia Arvidsson in the final 6–2, 6–2.

Seeds

Main draw

Finals

Top half

Bottom half

External Links
 Main Draw
 Qualifying Draw

Open GDF Suez Region Limousin - Singles
Open de Limoges
2011 in French tennis